The Chambers-Strathy Batholith, also called the Strathy-Chambers Batholith, is a large granitoid batholith complex in the Temagami region of Northeastern Ontario, Canada. Named for the Chambers and Strathy townships, its compositions range from pink to grey quartz monzonite to granodiorite and intrudes through rocks of the Temagami Greenstone Belt.

See also
Iceland Lake Pluton
Spawning Lake Stock

References

Batholiths of North America
Igneous petrology of Ontario
Geology of Temagami
Strathy Township